Catharina de Grebber (1496 – after 1515) was a Dutch woman. She is known as the victim of a famous case of kidnapping and rape in the Netherlands in 1515. The case was widely famed in the contemporary Netherlands, where it was published and popular within literature: it was also the subject of a song, where Catharina de Grebber was described as a rabbit persecuted by a hunter.

Biography 
Catharina de Grebber was the daughter of the wealthy shipper and patrician Pieter Claeszoon de Grebber and Alyt van Tetrode in Leiden. In 1509, at the age of thirteen, she was abducted by the nobleman Gerrit van Raaphorst and four accomplices on her way to church with her father in Wassenaar. Raaphorst took her to Sassenheim, where he married her. During this period, she was reportedly raped and locked up. Four months later, she returned to her parents.

When Raaphorst wished to have her returned, her parents sued him for forcing her to marry him. Raaphorst claimed that both the marriage and intercourse were voluntary. The court case continued for years, until 1515, when Raaphorst was judged guilty for rape and sentenced to a public walk of repentance and to pay for a painted window in the church. Raaphorst was executed for the murder of a man in 1524. The life of Catharina de Grebber after 1515 is not known.

See also
List of kidnappings
List of solved missing person cases

References

External Links
 Marja Volbeda, Grebber, Catharina de, in: Digitaal Vrouwenlexicon van Nederland. URL: Grebber, Catharina de (1495/1496-na 1515)

1496 births
1500s missing person cases
16th-century Dutch women
Formerly missing people
History of women in the Netherlands
Kidnapped children
Missing person cases in Europe
People of the Habsburg Netherlands